Music, Music and Only Music (German: Musik, Musik und nur Musik) is a 1955 West German musical comedy film directed by Ernst Matray and starring Walter Giller,  Inge Egger and Lonny Kellner.  It was made at the Bendestorf Studios outside Hamburg. The film's sets were designed by the art director Otto Pischinger.

Cast
 Walter Giller as Karl Zimmermann
 Inge Egger as 	Anni Pichler
 Eva Schreiber as 	Franzi
 Lonny Kellner as Evelyne Berger
 Suzy Miller as Sonja
 Horst Breitenfeld as 	Bill
 Claus Biederstaedt as Maurice
 Lionel Hampton as 	Self	
 Franz Schafheitlin as 	Berndorff
 John Schapar as 	Pat
 Hubert von Meyerinck as Bieberich
 Willy Maertens	
 Rudolf Platte

References

Bibliography
 Bock, Hans-Michael & Bergfelder, Tim. The Concise CineGraph. Encyclopedia of German Cinema. Berghahn Books, 2009.
 Goble, Alan. The Complete Index to Literary Sources in Film. Walter de Gruyter, 1999.

External links 
 

1955 films
1955 musical films
German musical films
West German films
1950s German-language films
1950s German films

de:Musik, Musik und nur Musik